Burger is a West Germanic surname. It is the Dutch and Afrikaans word for 'freeman' or 'citizen' (German Bürger, Low German Börger) and the surname is equivalent to the English surname Burgess. In Dutch and German speaking countries it may be a toponymic surname, indicating origin from any of a number of towns ending in -burg. Notable people with the surname include:

Academics
 Artur Burger (1943–2000), Austrian pharmacist and pharmacognosist
 Barbara Burger, American chemist 
 Boštjan Burger (born 1966), Slovenian informatician, geographer, and panoramic photographer
 Dionys Burger (1892–1987), Dutch physicist and science fiction author
 Edward Burger (born 1964), American mathematician and university president
  (1877–1916), German art historian
 Harald Burger (born 1940), German linguist
 Heinrich Bürger (Burger) (1806–1858), German/Dutch chemist and botanist
 Herman Carel Burger (1893–1965), Dutch biophysicist
 Joachim Burger (born 1969), German anthropologist and molecular biologist
  (1773–1842), Austrian agronomist
 Richard L. Burger (born 1950), American archaeologist and anthropologist
 Ronna Burger (born 1947), American philosopher 
 Rudolf Burger (1938–2021), Austrian philosopher
 William Carl Burger (born 1932), American botanist

Arts and writers
 Alex Burger (born 1972), American playwright and screenwriter
 Anthony Burger (1961–2006), American gospel pianist and singer
 Anton Burger (1824-1905), German painter
 Carl Burger (1888–1967), American writer and illustrator
 Claire Burger, French film director, film editor and screenwriter
 Cody Burger (born 1983), American former child actor
 Dai Burger, American rapper
 Eugene Burger (born 1939), American magician
  (1882–1969), German painter and graphic designer
 Gary Burger (1942–2014), American rock musician
 Germain Burger (1900–1985), British cinematographer and film director
 Hanuš Burger (1909–1990), Czech film director
 Hermann Burger (1942–1989), Swiss poet, novelist and essayist
 Janez Burger (born 1965), Slovene film director, screenwriter and producer.
 Johann Burger (1829–1912), Swiss engraver
 Jörg Burger (born 1962), German music producer
 Ludwig Burger (1825–1884), German historical painter and illustrator
 Markus Burger (born 1966), German pianist, composer and music educator
 Neil Burger, American film director
 Rob Burger, American accordionist, keyboardist and music director
 Werner Carl Burger (1925 - 2023), German painter
 Wilhelm J. Burger (1844–1920), Austrian photographer and painter
 Willi Burger (born 1934), Italian harmonica player

Politics and law
 Anna Burger (born 1950), American union leader
  (1804-1873), Austrian jurist and politician
 Jaap Burger (1904–1986), Dutch politician and government minister
 John Burger (1916–2005), American politician, businessman, and lawyer
 Karen Arnold-Burger (born 1957), American Chief Judge of the Kansas Court of Appeals
 Sarah Burger Stearns (1836–1904), American social reformer and suffragist
 Schalk Willem Burger (1852–1918), South African military leader and acting President
 Warren E. Burger (1907–1995), 15th Chief Justice of the United States

Sports
 Albert Burger (born 1955), German alpine skier
 Anina Burger (born 1967), South African cricketer
 Bernie Burger (born 1981), Namibian cricketer
 Chere Burger (born 1982), South African dressage rider
 Christopher Burger (born 1935), South African cricketer
 Chuck Burger (born 1936), American bridge player
 Cindy Burger (footballer) (born 1980), Dutch footballer
 Cindy Burger (tennis), Dutch tennis player
 Danie Burger (1933–1990), South African hurdler
 Dietmar Burger (born 1968), Austrian darts player
 Erin Burger (born 1980), South African netball player
 Fritzi Burger (1910–1999), Austrian figure skater'
 Guillaume Burger (born 1989), French sprint canoer
 Heinrich Burger (1881–1942), German figure skater
 Hubert Burger, Italian luger
 Jacques Burger (born 1983), Namibian rugby player
 Jake Burger (born 1996), American baseball player
 Jan-Berrie Burger (born 1981), Namibian cricketer
 Jiří Burger (born 1977), Czech ice hockey player
 Kai Burger (born 1992), German football forward
 Karl Burger (1883–1959), German soccer player and coach
 Louis Burger (born 1978), Namibian cricketer
 Lynette Burger (born 1980), South African cyclist
  (born 1939), Austrian alpine sk
 Nandre Burger (born 1995), South African cricketer
 Nina Burger (born 1987), Austrian footballer
 Paul Burger (1874–1940), Belgian road racing cyclist
 Peter Burger (born 1954), Swiss modern pentathlete
 Philip Burger (born 1980), South African rugby player
 Sándor Burger (1899–?), Hungarian sailor
 Sarel Burger (born 1983), Namibian cricketer
 Schalk Burger (born 1956) a.k.a. Burger Geldenhuys, South African rugby player
 Schalk Burger (born 1983), South African rugby player
 Tienie Burger (born 1993), South African rugby player
 Todd Burger (born 1970), American football player
 Vreny Burger (born 1955), Swiss archer
 Werner Burger (born 1958), German football coach

Other
 Adolf Burger (1917–2016), Slovak Holocaust survivor involved in Operation Bernhard
 Alewyn Burger (born 1951), South African banker
 Anton Burger (1911–1991), Austrian-German Nazi SS concentration camp commandant
 Bas Burger (born 1970), Dutch business executive
 Eberhard Burger (born 1943), German civil engineer
 Ernest Peter Burger (1906–1975), German saboteur during World War II
  (1800–1907), French Red Cross nurse during World War II
 Ida Burger, U.S. dance hall girl and prostitute
 Jean Burger (1907–1945), French communist and WWII resistance member
 Johan Burger, South African businessman
 Joseph Burger (1848–1921), Swiss German soldier who fought in the American Civil War
 Joseph C. Burger (1902–1982), United States Marine Corps officer and college athlete
 Knox Burger (1922–2010), American editor, writer, and literary agent
 Malcolm Burger, British World War I flying ace
 Michael Burger (born 1957), American television host
 Nelle G. Burger (1869-1957), American temperance leader
  (1866–1954), German glass blower and inventor
 Stephan Burger (born 1962), German Catholic archbishop
 Tutilo Burger (born 1965), German Benedictine monk and abbot
  (1904–1979), German SS-Sturmbannführer

Fictional people
Hamilton Burger, district attorney in the Perry Mason novels, films, and programs

See also
 Berger
 Bürger
 Burgers (surname)
 Burgher

Afrikaans-language surnames
Dutch-language surnames
German-language surnames